Masa Jovanovic (born 23 November 1994) is an Australian tennis player born in Serbia.

Jovanovic has a WTA singles career-high ranking of 583 achieved on 29 January 2018. She also has a WTA doubles career high-ranking of 650 achieved 26 February 2018. Jovanovic has won two doubles titles on the ITF Circuit.

Alongside Samuel Thompson, she won the mixed-doubles Wildcard Playoff into the 2015 Australian Open where they faced off against Martina Hingis and Leander Paes in the main draw, losing 2–6, 6–7(2–7).

In 2017, Jovanovic achieved a career-best singles result when she reached the quarterfinals of a $25k tournament in Goyang, South Korea. In late 2017, she reached the top 600 in singles for the first time.

In 2018, Jovanovic played her first WTA Tour tournament receiving a qualifying wild card to the Hobart International. There, she won the opening set against former top-15 player Kirsten Flipkens before losing in three sets. In March, she achieved a new career-best singles result in the $25k tournament in Mildura, reaching the semifinals. In June, she won her first ITF final (her first title win was by walkover), partnering Jelena Stojanovic in Niš, Serbia.

ITF finals

Doubles (2–1)

External links
 
 

1994 births
Living people
Australian female tennis players
Sportswomen from Victoria (Australia)
Australian people of Serbian descent
Serbian emigrants to Australia
Tennis players from Melbourne
People from Werribee, Victoria